Tom O'Brien (born 1986) is a British-based Irish jockey who competes in National Hunt racing.

Wexford-born O'Brien began his career in racing by riding out for his uncle Shay Slevin before starting to ride out for another uncle, Aidan O'Brien, where he rode champion horses such as High Chaparral and Rock of Gibraltar. After riding in point-to-points, O'Brien moved to England in 2004 to work at the stable of Philip Hobbs in Minehead, Somerset. He has remained at the same stable since 2004, becoming first jockey for Hobbs when Richard Johnson retired in 2021.

In the 2005/06 season, O'Brien was crowned champion amateur rider with 32 winners, Captain Corelli in the Tommy Whittle Chase at Haydock Park. He turned professional in June of that year, winning two races at his first professional race meeting. In the 2006/07 season he was champion conditional jockey.

In 2007 O'Brien rode McKelvey, trained by Peter Bowen, into second place behind Silver Birch in the Grand National. In the 2008 Grand National, McKelvey unseated O'Brien at the twentieth fence, went on to jump the next fence riderless, fell and was euthanized.

O'Brien achieved his first Cheltenham Festival win in 2009 when he rode Silk Affair to victory in the Fred Winter Juvenile Novices' Handicap Hurdle.

O'Brien won the Welsh Grand National on Dream Alliance, trained by Hobbs, in 2009 and Elegant Escape, trained by Colin Tizzard, in 2018.

In August 2021 O'Brien reached a landmark of 1,000 winners in Britain and Ireland, one of only seven current jump jockeys to do so. All but one of the wins were in Britain; O'Brien's only victory in Ireland was on I Hear A Symphony for Philip Hobbs at the Punchestown Festival in 2008.

O'Brien and wife Hayley have two sons.

Cheltenham Festival winners (1) 
 Pertemps Final - (1) - Third Wind (2022)

Major wins
Great Britain
Challow Novices' Hurdle - (1) - Souffleur (2009)
Tolworth Hurdle - (2) - Finian's Oscar (2017), Elixir Du Nutz (2019)
 Liverpool Hurdle - (1) Thyme Hill (2021)
 Kauto Star Novices' Chase - (1) -  Thyme Hill (2022)

References

External links
 Tom O'Brien statistics in Racing Post

Irish jockeys
1986 births
Living people
Lester Award winners